The following lists events that happened during 2015 in the United Arab Emirates.

Incumbents
President: Khalifa bin Zayed Al Nahyan 
Prime Minister: Mohammed bin Rashid Al Maktoum

Events

January
 January 5 - After being grounded in Abu Dhabi for over 12 hours with all passengers on board, Etihad Airways Flight 183 completes its flight to San Francisco International Airport.
 December 31 - A Fire broke out in The Address Downtown Dubai

Sport

January
 January 27 - Australia wins 2–0 against United Arab Emirates to advance to the 2015 AFC Asian Cup Final for the second consecutive time.

Deaths

September
 September 19 - Rashid bin Mohammed Al Maktoum

References

 
Years of the 21st century in the United Arab Emirates
United Arab Emirates
United Arab Emirates
2010s in the United Arab Emirates